Inger and Lasse Sandberg are Swedish authors of children's books. They have created many characters, including The Little Ghost Godfrey (Sw: Lilla Spöket Laban) and Little Anna and the Tall Uncle. Inger received the Nils Holgersson Plaque.

Lasse Sandberg died on 11 November 2008, in Karlstad, after a short illness. He was 84. Lasse Sandberg was also known as a talented artist and, formerly, a cartoonist and comic creator in his home country.

References

External links
 Lambiek Comiclopedia article about Lasse Sandberg

Swedish-language writers
Swedish illustrators
Swedish children's book illustrators
Swedish cartoonists
Swedish comics artists
Litteris et Artibus recipients